Sial Kot is one of the 51 union councils of Abbottabad District in Khyber-Pakhtunkhwa province of Pakistan. According to the 2017 Census of Pakistan, the population is 14,141.

Subdivisions
 Bandi Sararha
 Banota
 Chamiali
 Khokhriala
 Larri
 Sial Kot

References

Union councils of Abbottabad District